Sarcochilus hirticalcar, commonly known as the harlequin orchid, is a small epiphytic orchid endemic to Queensland. It has up to eight bright green leaves and up to twelve cream-coloured to bright yellow flowers with purplish to reddish brown bands.

Description
The side lobes are erect with purple stripes on the inside and the middle lobe is densely covered with white hairs. Flowering occurs between October and December but only up to three flowers are open at once.

Taxonomy and naming
The harlequin orchid was first formally described in 1967 by Alick Dockrill who gave it the name Parasarcochilus hirticalcar and published the description in Australasian Sarcanthinae. In 1998 Mark Clements and Benjamin John Wallace changed the name to Sarcochilus hirticalcar. The specific epithet (hirticalcar) is derived from the Latin words hirtus meaning "hairy", "rough" or "shaggy" and calcar meaning "a spur".

Distribution and habitat
Sarcochilus hirticalcar grows on trees in rainforest and along rivers, often growing on Dillenia alata.

References

Endemic orchids of Australia
Orchids of Queensland
Plants described in 1967
hirticalar